For tennis tournaments, Group B was one of two pools in the Americas Zone Group II of the 1998 Fed Cup. Eight teams competed in a round robin competition, with the top team advancing to Group I in 1999.

Puerto Rico vs. Jamaica

Cuba vs. Bahamas

Dominican Republic vs. Bolivia

Trinidad and Tobago vs. Panama

Puerto Rico vs. Bahamas

Cuba vs. Panama

Dominican Republic vs. Trinidad and Tobago

Bolivia vs. Jamaica

Puerto Rico vs. Bolivia

Cuba vs. Dominican Republic

Trinidad and Tobago vs. Jamaica

Panama vs. Bahamas

Puerto Rico vs. Panama

Cuba vs. Jamaica

Dominican Republic vs. Bahamas

Trinidad and Tobago vs. Bolivia

Puerto Rico vs. Trinidad and Tobago

Cuba vs. Bolivia

Dominican Republic vs. Panama

Jamaica vs. Bahamas

Puerto Rico vs. Dominican Republic

Cuba vs. Trinidad and Tobago

Panama vs. Jamaica

Bolivia vs. Bahamas

Puerto Rico vs. Cuba

Dominican Republic vs. Jamaica

Trinidad and Tobago vs. Bahamas

Panama vs. Bolivia

  placed first in the pool, and thus advanced to Group I in 1999, where they placed last in their pool of five and thus was relegated back to Group II for 2000.

See also
Fed Cup structure

References

External links
 Fed Cup website

1998 Fed Cup Americas Zone